Linoleate 9S-lipoxygenase (9-lipoxygenase, 9S-lipoxygenase, linoleate 9-lipoxygenase, LOX1 (gene), 9S-LOX) is an enzyme with systematic name linoleate:oxygen 9S-oxidoreductase. This enzyme catalyses the following chemical reaction

 linoleate + O2  (9S,10E,12Z)-9-hydroperoxy-10,12-octadecadienoate

Linoleate 9S-lipoxygenase contains nonheme iron.

References

External links 
 

EC 1.13.11